is a video game developed by Konami and released for Japanese arcades on August 30, 2018. A Microsoft Windows version, where users are charged per play, was announced in January 2021 alongside a open-beta test. It is a spin-off from the Bomberman series, and is played similarly to previous titles, with the most striking difference being the characters are all humanoid girls depicted in a bishoujo moé visual style. Eight players are split into two teams of four, who aim to destroy the other team's base by placing bombs and using character-specific abilities.

Gameplay
Bombergirl is played similarly to other Bomberman games. Two four-player teams play the game at a time and control one of several different characters, in matches where the goal is to destroy the other team's base. The players can place bombs, as well as use character-specific abilities; for instance, Shiro can place several bombs, Momoko can create blocks, Oren can move quickly, and Emera can use ranged attacks. Throughout the match, characters' levels are raised, allowing the player to use special attacks such as a beam sword and a flaming sword. After a match, characters on the losing team are displayed with their clothes burned apart in a comically sexual manner. The game also features various Konami crossover characters among its original cast, such as Grim Aloe from Quiz Magic Academy and Sephia Belmont, an original character inspired by Castlevania's "Belmont" protagonists.

Development and release
Bombergirl was developed by Konami. It was announced at the Japan Amusement Expo in February 2017 as an arcade-exclusive game, twenty years after the previous arcade Bomberman game, and was playable at the event. The developers intended for the new game elements the game introduces to the series to make the game fun to watch in addition to fun to play. A Microsoft Windows version was announced in January 2021, in which users are charged per play, in the same way players at on-location arcade cabinets are. The open beta for the Windows release launched on January 5, and was scheduled to run until January 12, but ended early on January 8 due to issues with the matchmaking service. Another beta test launched on November 4. 2021. Full service started on December 22, 2021.

Reception

Pre-release
Polygon described the game as "horny", similarly to their earlier game Otomedius, a Gradius-like shooting game where the player controls female characters rather than ships. Destructoid was positive to the pre-release footage, saying that they hoped it would be released in the West, and that they liked its cute aesthetic.

Notes

References

External links
  

2018 video games
Arcade video games
Windows games
Bomberman
Japan-exclusive video games
Video games developed in Japan
Video games featuring female protagonists
Video game spin-offs